William Keen (1680s–1754) was a merchant and judicial officer in the British colony of Newfoundland.

William Keen or Keene may also refer to:

Entertainment
William Keene (1915–1992), American TV actor
Bill Keene (1927–2000), American television and radio personality
Will Keen (born 1970), English actor

Other
William Keen (cricketer) (1792–1846), English amateur cricketer
William John Keen (1873–1958), Chief Commissioner of the North-West Frontier Province of British India
William Williams Keen (1837–1932), pioneer American brain surgeon

See also
William Keane (disambiguation)
William Kean (1871–1954), British trade unionist